Thomas Tracy may refer to:

 Thomas Tracy (MP died 1621) (1567–1621), MP for Wilton
  (1610-1685), migrant from England to the United States
 Thomas Tracy (MP died 1770) (c. 1716–1770), MP for Gloucestershire
 Tom Tracy (1934–1996), American footballer
 Thomas M. Tracy (born 1936) was United States Assistant Secretary of State for Administration
  (born 1948), American Christian philosopher

See also
Thomas Hanbury-Tracy, 2nd Baron Sudeley, British colliery owner and politician
Tracie Thomas, musician